Silvio Tozzi (14 April 1908 – 31 January 1986) was an Italian wrestler. He competed at the 1932 Summer Olympics and the 1936 Summer Olympics.

References

External links
 

1908 births
1986 deaths
Italian male sport wrestlers
Olympic wrestlers of Italy
Wrestlers at the 1932 Summer Olympics
Wrestlers at the 1936 Summer Olympics
Sportspeople from the Province of Padua
20th-century Italian people